Single Piece Flow is an album by American jazz reedist Ken Vandermark, which was recorded in 1996 and released on Atavistic. It was the debut of the Vandermark 5, which features Mars Williams on reeds, Jeb Bishop on trombone and guitar, Kent Kessler on bass and Tim Mulvenna on drums.

Reception

In his review for AllMusic, Brian Olewnick states "The musicians are all up to the task... But the 'stars' of the album are the compositions themselves, probing and muscular, offering a fresh way through the stasis that was building in some circles of avant jazz by the mid-'90s."

The Penguin Guide to Jazz says "Almost temperate in parts, there's some exemplary use of the group as a unit, with a piece like 'The Mark Inside' offering a sort of jaundiced twist on jazz tradition."

The Down Beat review by Aaron Cohen notes that "Vandermark's themes are often based around endearing riffs that are never merely cute and provide a lively framework for each performer's agility."

Track listing
All compositions by Ken Vandermark
 "Careen" – 7:00
 "Momentum" – 7:16
 "Fence" – 7:01
 "Data Janitor" – 9:42
 "The Mark Inside" – 6:45
 "Wood-Skin Metal" – 6:10
 "Billboard" (Jim Baker) – 4:57
 "Limited Edition" – 9:16

Personnel
Jeb Bishop – trombone, guitar
Kent Kessler – bass
Tim Mulvenna – drums
Ken Vandermark – reeds
Mars Williams – reeds

References

1997 albums
Ken Vandermark albums
Atavistic Records albums